Ester Eugenia Hofvander-Sandberg, born February 10, 1888, in Skårby, died October 7, 1967, in Eslöv, was one of Sweden's first female lawyers.

As a lawyer, Ester Hofvander-Sandberg was known to be an energetic and sharp lawyer, and she ran her processes with an iron hand. For her efforts during her professional life, Ester Hofvander-Sandberg was named a member of the first class of the Order of Vasa in November 1955.

References

Further reading 
 

1888 births
1967 deaths
Swedish women lawyers
20th-century Swedish lawyers
Recipients of the Order of Vasa
20th-century women lawyers
20th-century Swedish women